ForeverAtLast is an American rock band from Indianapolis, Indiana. The band's current lineup has been active since 2010 and they are signed to Victory Records.

Background
Foreveratlast is Post-hardcore band that originated in Indianapolis, Indiana. The band has consists of Vocalist Brittany Ritchey, Guitarist and Backing Vocalist Jordan Vickers, drummer Jared Paris and bassist and backing vocalist Seth Brown. After many tour dates after the release of 2012's February to February, the band has traveled all over the country and caught the attention of several labels. Going with Victory Records and signing late in 2014, they went to work on Ghosts Again, which was released on October 16, 2015. The band keeps a rigorous tour schedule.

Members
Current
 Brittany Ritchey - Vocals
 Jared Paris - Drums
 Austin Puckett - Bass
 Josh Redman - Guitar

Former
 Michael Goodrich - Bass and vocals
 Jordan Vickers - Guitars
 Seth Brown - Bass and vocals
 Chris Lantz - Guitar and vocals

Discography
 Welcome To Last Cause Population: Zero (EP) [2009]
 February To February (LP) [June 12, 2012]
 Ghosts Again (LP) [October 16, 2015]
 Holy Ghost (Single) [August 21, 2020]

References

External links

American Christian metal musical groups
Victory Records artists
Musical groups established in 2008
Musical groups from Indianapolis